353 Ruperto-Carola (prov. designation:  or ) is a background asteroid from the central region of the asteroid belt. It was discovered by German astronomer Max Wolf at the Heidelberg Observatory on 16 January 1893. It is named after the Ruprecht Karls University (University of Heidelberg), whose Latin name is Ruperto Carola Heidelbergensis.

References

External links 
 Lightcurve plot of 353 Ruperto-Carola, Palmer Divide Observatory, B. D. Warner (2006)
 Asteroid Lightcurve Database (LCDB), query form (info )
 Dictionary of Minor Planet Names, Google books
 Asteroids and comets rotation curves, CdR – Observatoire de Genève, Raoul Behrend
 Discovery Circumstances: Numbered Minor Planets (1)-(5000) – Minor Planet Center
 
 

000353
Discoveries by Max Wolf
Named minor planets
000353
18930116